The women's 400 metres hurdles event at the 2019 Summer Universiade was held on 8, 9 and 10 July at the Stadio San Paolo in Naples.

Medalists

Results

Heats
Qualification: First 3 in each heat (Q) and next 4 fastest (q) qualified for the semifinals.

Semifinals
Qualification: First 3 in each heat (Q) and next 2 fastest (q) qualified for the final.

Final

References

400
2019